Víctor Córdoba may refer to:

Víctor Córdoba (boxer) (born 1962), Panamanian boxer
Víctor Córdoba (footballer) (born 1987), Colombian footballer